The large moth subfamily Lymantriinae contains the following genera beginning with J:

Jabaina
Jacksoniana

References 

Lymantriinae
Lymantriid genera J